The Australian Department of Jobs and Small Business was a department of the Government of Australia charged with the responsibility for employment, job services and the labour market, workplace relations, small business, and deregulation. The Department was established on the 20 December 2017, and was part of the larger Jobs and Innovation portfolio which also includes the Department of Industry, Innovation and Science which reported to the Minister for Jobs and Industrial Relations, the Hon Kelly O'Dwyer MP. The final head of the department was the Secretary of the Department of Jobs and Small Business, Kerri Hartland.

On 29 May 2019, the Employment and Industrial Relations portfolios were split, with responsibility for Industrial Relations transferring to the Attorney-General's Department and reporting to the Australian Attorney-General, the Hon Christian Porter MP, and the employment portfolio becoming the Department of Employment, Skills, Small and Family Business, under Senator the Hon Michaelia Cash.

History
The department was formed by way of an Administrative Arrangements Order issued on 20 December 2017 and replaced the functions previously performed by the Department of Employment which was formed in 2013.

Preceding departments

Department of Labor and Immigration (12 June 1974 – 22 December 1975)
Department of Employment and Industrial Relations (22 December 1975 – 5 December 1978)
Department of Employment and Youth Affairs (5 December 1978 – 7 May 1982)
Department of Employment and Industrial Relations (7 May 1982 – 24 July 1987)
Department of Employment, Education and Training (24 July 1987 – 11 March 1996)
Department of Employment, Education, Training and Youth Affairs (11 March 1996 – 21 October 1998)
Department of Employment, Workplace Relations and Small Business (21 October 1998 – 26 November 2001)
Department of Employment and Workplace Relations (26 November 2001 – 3 December 2007)
Department of Education, Employment and Workplace Relations (3 December 2007 – 18 September 2013)
Department of Employment (18 September 2013 - 20 December 2017)

Operational activities

The functions of the department are broadly classified into the following matters:

Employment policy, including employment services
 Job Services Australia
Labour market programs for people of working age
Workplace relations policy development, advocacy and implementation
Promotion of flexible workplace relations policies and practices, including workplace productivity
Co-ordination of labour market research
 Occupational health and safety, rehabilitation and compensation
 Equal employment opportunity
Work and family programs
 Reducing the burden of government regulation 
Small business policy and programmes

See also

 Minister for Employment
 List of Australian Commonwealth Government entities

References

External links
 Department of Jobs and Small Business website
 Australian Institute for Teaching and School Leadership Website

Jobs and Small Business
Australia, Employment
Public policy in Australia
Australia
Labour in Australia
Employment in Australia
2017 establishments in Australia
2019 disestablishments in Australia
Ministries disestablished in 2019